Alberto Delgado Quintana (born 4 June 1991) is a Spanish footballer who plays for Cacereño as a left back.

Club career

Spain
Born in Cabezón de la Sal, Cantabria, Delgado was a Racing Santander youth graduate. On 8 November 2009 he made his senior debut for the reserves, coming on as a half-time substitute in a 1–1 home draw against Vecindario in the Segunda División B championship. He only appeared in one further match, as the B-team suffered relegation.

Delgado subsequently represented Barakaldo CF, SD Amorebieta and SD Leioa, all in the third and fourth divisions.

Senica
On 14 July 2016, Delgado signed for Fortuna Liga club FK Senica. He made his professional debut three days later, starting in a 0–1 home loss against Slovan Bratislava.

He left the club in January 2017 for signing with Spanish fourth division club Real Avilés.

References

External links
 
 Alberto Delgado at Senica's official website 
 
 Alberto Delgado profile at Futbalnet 

1991 births
Living people
Spanish footballers
Footballers from Cantabria
Association football defenders
Segunda División B players
Tercera División players
Rayo Cantabria players
Barakaldo CF footballers
SD Amorebieta footballers
SD Leioa players
Slovak Super Liga players
FK Senica players
Spain youth international footballers
Spanish expatriate footballers
Spanish expatriate sportspeople in Slovakia
Expatriate footballers in Slovakia